John Wyman may refer to:

 John Wyman (magician) (1816–1881), American magician
 John Wyman (actor) (fl. 1977–1995), British actor